The Half-Breed; A Tale of the Western Frontier is a fictional story written by Walt Whitman in 1845, which was originally published under the name of "Arrow-Tip". Walt Whitman was an American journalist and poet from West Hill, New York. The Half-Breed; A Tale of the Western Frontier, was published anonymously in the Aristidean and the Brooklyn Daily Eagle. The story takes place west of the Mississippi River in a little town called Warren.

The Half Breed  is a tale of the relationship between local Native Americans and the white settlers who are the inhabitants of Warren and the idea of Westward Expansion. Walt Whitman was known as strong supporter of Westward Expansion. The main characters get along until a thief is caught and a white man, Peter Brown, is thought to be dead. This reveals some possible hidden agendas from a few of the characters, along with some underlying suspicions from the townsfolk. There is a character of "mixed-blood", Boddo, who is described as a half white and half Native American hunchback of the town. He does not seem to be respected by the people of the town due to his appearance. Once revealed, Boddo's story helps the audience understand why the short story was given his name. This interesting tale gives a great idea of the attitude around this time period, while adding mystery and stories of betrayals.

Background 

Walt Whitman wrote The Half-Breed; A Tale of the Western Frontier during the lead up to the Mexican-American War, while he was editor of the Brooklyn Daily Eagle. He frequently voiced his opinions of Mexico, especially regarding the wars between the United States and Mexican territories. When talking about how Mexico will be affected by the war, Whitman says "Mexico will be a severed and cut up nation. She deserves this, -- or rather her government deserves it, because Mexican rule has been more a libel on liberty than liberty itself". He was a believer of manifest destiny, and wanted the United States to expand as far as it could. Therefore, he was supportive of wars fought between anyone who wanted to get in the way of that. As Shivley states, "Whitman supported the Wilmot Proviso that would exclude slavery from conquered territories and called for an end to the war. Those like Whitman who could not support the extension of slavery founded the Free Soil Party".

The Half-Breed is one of Whitman's earlier works, and his second-longest, just behind Franklin Evans, a temperance novel. Throughout his works, Whitman alludes to Native Americans and contributes to the vanishing Indian trope. There are arguments of Whitman's racial bias towards Native Americans. Some argue that he shows "fondness for Indian subjects"  because of his frequent inclusion of Natives in his narratives. Others argue that the representation of Native people feeds into negative mindset towards Natives. For example, Some say that in The Half-Breed Whitman "lapses into the stock racial profile of an 'apathetic" and expressionless Native American." The silent Native character, mixed in with Whitman's inclusion of expansion, feeds into the vanishing Indian trope. Whitman also made the decision to end Arrow-Tip's life in the story, which also plays into the trope.

In The Half Breed, Whitman seems to include another political statement. Many say he is creating an argument against capital punishment. In the story Arrow-Tip "dies as a result of mistaken testimony, revenge, and a precipitant legal hanging." Arrow-Tip's unnecessary death highlights the dangers that capital punishment comes with. By choosing to end Arrow-Tip's life, the townspeople took responsibility for him. Whitman's possible statement shows that some people will be wrongfully accused, and the aftermath of that situation is messy and difficult to deal with.

Whitman published The Half Breed under the name Arrow-Tip in The Aristidean in March 1845. The novelette was republished under its current name in June 1846 in The Brooklyn Daily Eagle.

Plot 

The story opens with Boddo, who is an ill-respected, physically-deformed and unattractive man of white and Native American parentage, as he travels to tell Father Luke about a wedding that is set to take place between the blacksmith Peter Brown and his intended. On the day of the wedding, Master Caleb leaves, only to witness the Native American Arrow-Tip coming over the hill. A few days later, some items are stolen from Mr. Thorne. Arrow-Tip is automatically assumed to be the thief despite no evidence to suggest this. Shortly after, Arrow-Tip uncovers the thief to be none other than the town hunchback, Boddo.

Meanwhile, Peter's bride has come to befriend Father Luke, who has been spending more time with the villagers, and manages to convince him to tell her of the events that brought him to his current situation. He tells her of his upbringing in Ireland and of his adventures to America. Upon arriving to America, he meets a Native American woman with whom he fathers a child, Boddo, who is unaware of this. His story is interrupted by some disturbing news of an event that took place during a hunting party. While hunting, two of the men in the party chose to create a raft. As they reach their destination, they hear Peter Brown and Arrow-Tip quarreling. Upon reaching shore, they discover the blacksmith unconscious next to a silent Arrow-Tip. He refuses to answer any questions, as he knows that it would serve no good. The two men throw a blanket over Peter and take Arrow-Tip back to the village to announce Peter's death and Arrow-Tip's crime. They do not closely examine the blacksmith and as such, do not discover that he is still alive.

Upon waking up, Peter quickly thinks of the argument between him and Arrow-Tip, deeming himself to be in the wrong. He's discovered by Boddo, who then takes him to Father Luke's cave, the safest available shelter. While fetching water for Peter, Boddo meets Father Luke who tells him that Arrow-Tip has been accused of Peter's murder. When Peter learns of Arrow-Tip's situation, he suggests sending Boddo to alert the villagers that he is alive because he is still too weak to make the journey himself. While traveling to the village, Boddo decides to play with the fate of Arrow-Tip's life for exposing his indiscretions earlier in the story. He and the villagers travel to the place of the purported murder and discover that Peter is gone, causing them to assume that Deer, Arrow-Tip's brother, stole the body away in an attempt to acquit Arrow-Tip.

When they return home the townsmen are determined of Arrow-Tip's guilt and decide to enact vengeance. Arrow-Tip manages to convince the men to let him tell his story in front of the entire village, upon which point he says that the quarrel was over a wager over who would – or wouldn't – catch any game, with some of their possessions as the prize. During the conversation Peter lost his temper and upon seeing Arrow-Tip try to take the weapon he had wagered, the two men began to scuffle. Arrow-Tip is convinced that he did indeed kill Peter, as are the townsmen. Boddo is the only person who can back it up, he knows the truth and despite being present, doesn't come forward. As a result, Arrow-Tip is sentenced to die the following morning via hanging. That following morning the townspeople are glib and a comparison is made to the celebration at Peter's wedding. Deer is allowed to visit his brother. During their meeting Arrow-Tip tells him that he's determined to approach his impending death stoically and that his sentence would have been the same with their own people.

While this is taking place, two schoolchildren discover Peter Brown sunning himself along the riverbank near Father Luke's home. They quickly rush to Master Caleb who, along with Quincy, realize that Boddo has lied about discovering Peter dead. They travel to Father Luke's cave and discover that Peter is alive. They quickly travel to tell the others that Peter is alive, but are too late and arrive just after Arrow-Tip's hanging. Attempts to cut him down and revive him are unsuccessful. Three days after Arrow-Tip's death Father Luke and Deer leave the town. Whitman states that years into the future an aged friar will be buried while hundreds of miles away an Indian leader leads his tribe further west in an attempt to avoid being bothered by the white man. The fate of Boddo is unknown, only that he fled the town and is believed to be either dead or living a similar miserable existence in another place. Meanwhile, Master Caleb has become the leader of an incorporated academy while Quincy is well respected and will likely be nominated for political office. One of his best admirers is Peter Brown, who has survived and fathered multiple children.

Characters 
 Boddo: The "half breed" of the story that was mistreated not only because of the pigmentation of his skin but because of his lack of intelligence and hunched over back. He was later classified as a liar and a thief throughout the story and became the villain of the story.
 Peter Brown: A Blacksmith; He marries the daughter of a respectable man. Peter ends up being "killed" by Arrow Tip, but in the end we find out that his death was a lie. He actually recovered in the care of Father Luke.
 Arrow Tip: Arrow-Tip is the brother of Deer. He is accused of theft followed by being accused of murder, which he was executed for. It is later found out that Arrow Tip did not murder Peter Brown. Because Boddo did not come forth with the secret that he kept concerning Peter Brown's condition, Arrow-Tip was publicly executed for the murder of Peter Brown.
 Deer: Deer is the brother of Arrow-Tip, and says very little throughout the story. 
 Master Caleb: Master Caleb is an educator in Warren, and develops a rather odd relationship with a child in his class named Quincy.
 Father Luke: Father Luke is a monk who lives a little while from the town of Warren. He is revealed to be Boddo's biological father.

Themes 
Isolation/Abandonment: There have been many times that characters in this text deal with abandonment and not feeling accepted. Boddo for example, in the beginning of the text, was picked on simply because he did not look like everyone else or have the same intellect as those around him. He was also shunned by his father because of his in-capabilities and differences in belief and stature. Whitman makes it clear throughout the text that Native characters were only in Warren for a short time, or if they stayed they were outcasts. He writes his characters as if they're already gone, like when Arrow-Tip was completely silent after he was accused of murder. The idea of isolation or abandoning someone or something relates to the Vanishing Indian trope, which shows the erasure of Native American people through history and literature, but is still relevant and can be found to this day.

Absence of Women: "The absence of women in the tale also strikes one as odd, even for a frontier story." Throughout the story there are brief mentions of three women (Peter Brown's wife, Boddo's mom, and Father Luke's sister) that do not serve a strong purpose, but simply mention their name and relation to a prominent husband or another male character of the text. Peter Brown's fiancée "serves as a mere audience for Father Luke's long monologue regarding his scandalous past" This open our eyes as the reader to the continuation of race and sexuality and how the three are highlighted throughout the text. Though the absence of women is "hidden" in a way that is not noted from the author, it still strikes as a theme worth emphasizing in relation to the meaning of the text. Women in the short story were only used as vessels for men to get what they need, which shows how women were considered during the time.

Representation of Mixed Race People: Boddo is mentioned as "deformed in body – his back being mounted with a mighty hunch, and his long neck bent forward". All other characters mentioned in the text, including Native American people, would be considered  "normal" and without any deformities. In fact, "Whitman's idealization of Arrow-Tip, the story's pure-blood is portrayed above all as honest, noble, and endowed with a close-to-the-Iand authenticity. The negative racism against the Native American, on the other hand, is projected almost exclusively upon Boddo, just as he also embodies the "monstrous" nature of any mixing of the races." By making Boddo, our "half-breed" character the center of the story, he is highlighting the deformities Boddo has. The only space a mixed-person has in this text is as a deformed, hated character. The idea of mixture during this time was scary, and Whitman shows an example of what could happen as a bad result of mixture. "And so is Boddo vilified as the stock villain of his story, in part because of the others' anxious inability to 'class' him as 'Red' or 'White', as an entity indefinitely positioned on the 'Chain’. And yet there are places in the tale in which an inkling of sympathy for Boddo peeks through the cracks"

References 

Brooklyn Eagle
1845 short stories